Graham Stokes may refer to:

 Graham Stokes (music executive) (born 1958), British music executive and musician
 Graham Stokes (cricketer) (1858–1921), English cricketer
 James Graham Phelps Stokes (1872–1960), known as Graham, American millionaire socialist writer, political activist, and philanthropist